McAuley, MacAuley, or Macauley may refer to:

People
People with the surname:
McAuley (surname) (also MacAuley and Macauley), derived from Gaelic patronyms
People with the given name:
Macaulay Culkin, American child actor

Places
McAuley
McAuley, Manitoba, a community located in the Rural Municipality of Archie, Manitoba, Canada
McAuley Park, a small public municipal park located in Vancouver, Canada.

Schools
McAuley
Catherine McAuley High School, located in Portland, Maine, USA.
Catherine McAuley High School (Brooklyn), located in USA.
McAuley Catholic College, located in Grafton, NSW, Australia.
McAuley Catholic High School (Joplin, Missouri), located in USA.
McAuley High School (disambiguation), several schools
McAuley High School (Cincinnati, Ohio), located in USA.
McAuley High School (Toledo, Ohio), located in USA.
McAuley High School (New Zealand), located in Otahuhu, New Zealand. 
McAuley School District No. 27, located in Winfield Township, Illinois, USA.
Mother McAuley Liberal Arts High School, located in Chicago, Illinois, USA.
The McAuley Catholic High School, located in Doncaster, South Yorkshire, England.

Other
Macauley
Macauley Island, volcanic island belonging to the Kermadec Islands
Macauley's Theatre, the premier theatre in Louisville, Kentucky during the late 19th and early 20th century
McAuley
McAuley Schenker Group, a musical group
The McAuley Boys, a musical group
M.S.G. (McAuley Schenker Group album), a music album by the McAuley Schenker Group

See also
Macaulay (disambiguation)
McCauley (disambiguation)
Auley (given name)
Baron de Mauley